The 1956 Lower Hutt mayoral election was part of the New Zealand local elections held that same year. The elections were held for the role of Mayor of Lower Hutt plus other local government positions including fifteen city councillors, also elected triennially. The polling was conducted using the standard first-past-the-post electoral method.

Background
The incumbent Mayor, Percy Dowse, sought re-election for a third term. Dowse was opposed by William Giltrap who stood as an independent candidate. Giltrap had been a Citizens' Association councillor from 1947 to 1950 and again from 1951 to 1953. At this election the Citizens' Association (whose tickets won no seats at the 1950 and 1953 elections) did not stand an official ticket of candidates. Instead Giltrap led a group of five other candidates (known cumulatively as the "Ratepayer Independents") against the Labour council ticket. Labour won even more decisively than they had in the previous two elections. It won the mayoralty, a majority on the Hutt River Board along with all seats on the city council, power board, gas board, harbour board and hospital board. The only non-Labour seat was won by Giltrap who was elected to the river board.

Mayoral results

Councillor results

 
 
 
 
 
 
 
 
 
 
 
 
 
 
 
 
 
 
 
 
 

Table footnotes:

Notes

References

Mayoral elections in Lower Hutt
1956 elections in New Zealand
Politics of the Wellington Region